Parque Nacional Los Volcanes, also known as Cerro Verde National Park, is a large national park in El Salvador.

The park includes three volcanoes: Cerro Verde, Izalco, and Santa Ana.

References

External links
 Parque Nacional Los Volcanes, El Salvador tourism
 Parque Nacional Los Volcanes, Official park site  
 Parque Nacional Los Volcanes, from SalvaNatura  
 Parque Nacional Los Volcanes, from Lonely Planet

National parks of El Salvador
Central American pine–oak forests